Kandar-e Abdol Reza (also Romanized as Kandar-e ‘Abdol Reẕā; also known as Kandar-e ‘Abd or Reẕā) is a village in Sigar Rural District, in the Central District of Lamerd County, Fars Province, Iran. At the 2006 census, its population was 587, in 125 families.

References 

Populated places in Lamerd County